Reopalu is a village in Türi Parish, Järva County in central Estonia.

References
 

Villages in Järva County